Sakaba is a Local Government Area in Kebbi State, Nigeria. Its headquarters are in the town of Dirindaji.

It has an area of 1,260 km and a population of 89,937 at the 2006 census.

The postal code of the area is 872.

References

Local Government Areas in Kebbi State